Workers Party (Marxist–Leninist) (in Spanish: Partido Obrero (Marxista-Leninista)) was a Trotskyist political party in Panama. PO(M-L) was founded in 1934 by Diógenes de la Rosa. For a brief period PO(M-L) was able to compete with the Communist Party over influence in the trade union movement, the tenants movement and other mass movements.

PO(M-L) struggled against the U.S. hegemony over Panama.

1934 establishments in Panama
Communist parties in Panama
Defunct political parties in Panama
Political parties established in 1934
Political parties with year of disestablishment missing
Trotskyist organizations in North America